The Treaty of Nürtingen was a treaty in German history, signed on 25 January 1442. It divided the county of Württemberg between count Ludwig I and his brother count Ulrich V. The county had first been divided on 23 April 1441 following Ulrich's marriage to Margarethe von Cleve, with Ulrich receiving the lands west of the Neckar and Ludwig receiving the lands east. This original division was intended to last four years, leaving Stuttgart as a shared city assigned to neither side, but was soon found to be unequal. In the amended permanent division stipulated by the Treaty of Nürtingen in 1442, the Stuttgart half went to Ulrich and included (among others) the cities of Cannstatt, Göppingen, Marbach, Neuffen, Nürtingen, Schorndorf and Waiblingen. The Urach half went to Ludwig and included (among others) the cities of Balingen, Calw, Herrenberg, Münsingen, Tuttlingen and Tübingen. This division was rescinded by the Treaty of Münsingen on 14 December 1482 and reinstated by the Treaty of Esslingen in 1492.

References

External links 
 Bestand A 602 of the Hauptstaatsarchiv Stuttgart: Notes and full text

History of Württemberg
Munsingen
1440s in the Holy Roman Empire
1442 in Europe
1440s treaties